The 2014–15 Slovak First Football League (known as the Slovak Fortuna Liga for sponsorship reasons) was the 22nd season of first-tier football league in Slovakia, since its establishment in 1993. This season started on 11 July 2014. ŠK Slovan Bratislava were the defending champions.

Teams
A total of 12 teams competed in the league, including 11 sides from the 2013–14 season and one promoted from the 2. liga.

Relegation for FC Nitra to the 2014–15 DOXXbet liga was confirmed on 20 May 2014. The one relegated team was replaced by ŽP Šport Podbrezová.

Stadiums and locations

Personnel and kits

Managerial changes

League table

Results

First and second round

Third round

Season statistics

Top scorers
Updated through matches played on 30 May 2015.

Hat-tricks

Clean sheets

Updated through matches played on 30 May 2015

Awards
Source:

Top Eleven

Goalkeeper:  Miloš Volešák (AS Trenčín/MŠK Žilina)
Defence:  Ernest Mabouka (MŠK Žilina),  Ramón (AS Trenčín),  Milan Škriniar (MŠK Žilina),  Matúš Čonka (Spartak Trnava)
Midfield:  Viktor Pečovský (MŠK Žilina),  Stanislav Lobotka (AS Trenčín),   Jaroslav Mihalík (MŠK Žilina),  Ján Vlasko (Spartak Trnava)
Attack:  Jan Kalabiška (FK Senica),  Matej Jelić (MŠK Žilina)

Individual Awards

Manager of the season

Martin Ševela and Ivan Vrabec (AS Trenčín)

Player of the Year

Viktor Pečovský (MŠK Žilina)

Young player of the Year

Matúš Bero (AS Trenčín)

See also
2014–15 Slovak Cup
2014–15 2. Liga (Slovakia)

Stats 
 List of foreign players
 List of transfers summer 2014
 List of transfers winter 2014–15

References

2014–15 in European association football leagues
2014-15
1